Gavi is a village in Pathanamthitta district, Kerala, India.The nearest railway station is Chengannur  (120 km). It is located 28 km southwest of Vandiperiyar, a town in Idukki on N.H 220, the highway connecting Kollam and Madurai. Until 2012, Gavi was not known to many people and it became a major tourist destination after the release of Malayalam movie Ordinary, which was mainly shot at Gavi.

Getting there 
The nearest railway station is Chengannur  (120 km).

The nearest railway station to gavi is Chengannur  it is about (120 km) from gavi.

Gavi is 14 km south west of Vandiperiyar, 28 km from Kumily, near Thekkady. Gavi is inside the Ranni reserve forest. Gavi is a part of Seethathode Panchayath in Ranni Taluk. Gavi is part of the Periyar Tiger Reserve, and the route can be covered by car from Vandiperiyar. Gavi is well known as an ecotourism destination. The entrance fee is 25 rupees per person and 50 rupees per vehicle. Cameras are 25 rupees and video cameras are charged 100 rupees. Both day and night stays are available. Forest tent camping is available from November through March.  . It has been said that most enjoyable route to Gavi is the way from Pathanamthitta. 

Botanists have said that "gopher trees" can be seen in Gavi, Kerala.  Gavi's forest area, there are two gopher trees and they are believed to be the only two gopher trees in India. The tree, which is identified as gopher, is known as nirampalli. Gopher wood or gopherwood is a term used once in the Bible. There is no consensus about what modern species is meant by "gopher wood".

The tree standing at Gavi forest is of robust stem and lush foliage. According to state Forest Department officials, though the fully-grown gopher in Gavi is the only such tree sighted in the periphery of the jungle, possibly there could be more such trees still surviving in the inner forests of Periyar Tiger Reserve (PTR) in Kerala.

Flora and fauna 

Gavi's evergreen forests are abundant with wildlife including the tiger, elephants, leopards, bears, Indian gaur, sambar, barking and mouse deers, lion tailed macaque, Nilgiri langur, Nilgiri marten, Malabar giant squirrel  and more than 250 species of birds.

Climate 

Summer: February–April, daytime temperatures up to 28 °C. but can drop to 20 °C at night.
Monsoon: June–August, daytime temperatures up to 25 °C but can drop to 10 °C at night.

Gallery

In visual media 
The 1973 released Malayalam movie Ponnapuram Kotta was filmed at Echopara and Gavi.

The 2012 Malayalam movie Ordinary was partially shot at Gavi. Gavi became a major tourist destination after the release of Ordinary.

References

External links 

Villages in Pathanamthitta district